Norman William Kingsley (October 26, 1829 – February 20, 1913) was a dentist and an artist in the 19th century. He was a major contributor in the early development of orthodontic treatments and cleft palate therapy. He designed fixed and removable inclined planes to correct Angle Class II malocclusions. He also designed the first soft-rubber palatal obturators, which enabled patients with cleft palate to enjoy normal speech and function. He was the first person in 1880 to introduce the concept of "jumping the bite for patients with a retruded mandible".

Childhood and education
He was born in October 1829 in Stockholm, New York. During his childhood years, he migrated to different states such as Vermont and Pennsylvania in order for his father to find a job but ultimately coming back to upstate New York. He was the eldest of six children. At age of 15, he left school to work as a store clerk and a bookkeeper. He was eventually introduced to dentistry by his uncle, Albigence W. Kingsley, who was a dental physician in Elizabeth, NJ. In 1850, when he was 20 years old, Kingsley spent six months at his uncle's practice learning about the job. In 1852, he started practicing in New York City at the office of Solyman Brown. Brown influenced Kingsley through his talents as a sculptor and writer. Kingsley eventually opened up his own practice in Manhattan. In 1871, he received his Honorary degree from Baltimore College of Dental Surgery.

Career
Kingsley attained skills in sculpturing and was well known for his crafts in crafting dental prosthesis. He won two gold medals in a row at World's fair Competitions in New York City (1853) and Paris (1855). He published a report of the case, a child with a V-shaped alveolar arch, in 1858 in the New York Dental Journal. In 1859, Kingsley created an artificial palate of soft vulcanized India rubber for his first patient with a cleft palate. He eventually moved into teaching and became the Founder of the New York College of Dentistry, serving as its first dean from 1865 to 1869. Kingsley was also known for his work related to the vulcanite palatal plate which consisted of anterior incline which allowed a person to bite forward with their lower jaw. His appliance was later modified by Hotz and it was known as Vorbissplatte.

During the 1870s, Kingsley was working on a textbook. In 1880, he published, A Treatise on Oral Deformities as a Branch of Mechanical Surgery, which was published in New York and later in Germany and Britain. This was the first truly comprehensive textbook that talked about orthodontic problems and treatments. This textbook discussed the etiology, diagnosis and treatment planning that should be the foundations of practice of a working orthodontist. The textbook was the first to discuss cleft palate treatment in terms of orthodontics.

He was also a prolific writer with over 100 articles on cleft lip and palate rehabilitation.

He retired in 1904 in New York City.

Contributions
 During 1860s, he introduced the concept of "jumping the bite" with the use of bite plate.  
 In 1879, he introduced occipital traction into the field of orthodontics. 
 In 1859, he perfected gold obturator and artificial vellum of soft rubber.
 In 1858, he published the first paper on modern orthodontics

Death 
Kingsley died in Warren Point, New Jersey, on February 20, 1913.

References

American dentists
Orthodontists
1829 births
1913 deaths
People from Stockholm, New York
19th-century dentists